Hữu Lũng is a rural district of Lạng Sơn province in the Northeast region of Vietnam. As of 2003 the district had a population of 114,638 . The district covers an area of 805 km2. The district capital lies at Hữu Lũng.

Administration subdivisions
Capital: Hữu Lũng Township (the only township in the district)
Communes: 25 communes:
Commune of Hòa Thắng
Commune of Minh Hòa
Commune of Minh Sơn
Commune of Sơn Hà
Commune of Hồ Sơn
Commune of Tân Thành
Commune of Hòa Sơn
Commune of Hòa Lạc
Commune of Yên Sơn
Commune of Cai Kinh
Commune of Đồng Tân 
Commune of Nhật Tiến
Commune of Minh Tiến
Commune of Đô Lương
Commune of Vân Nham 
Commune of Đồng Tiến
Commune of Thanh Sơn
Commune of Thiện Ky
Commune of Tân Lập
Commune of Quyết Thắng
Commune of Yên Bình
Commune of Hòa Bình
Commune of Yên Vượng
Commune of Yên Thịnh
Commune of Hữu Liên

References

Districts of Lạng Sơn province
Lạng Sơn province